Twister is an experimental peer-to-peer microblogging program. It is decentralized; consequently it cannot be shut down by an attack as there is no single point to attack. The system uses end-to-end encryption to safeguard communications. It is based on both BitTorrent- and Bitcoin-like protocols and has been likened to a distributed version of Twitter.

In 2020 author Miguel Freitas posted that he would not be leading Twister development for the foreseeable future, although the Twister network continued running, and suggested that others might wish to fork the project. He said that the Web site might go offline as hosting was due to expire. The Twister core had been at version 0.9.40 since 2018. Twister remained on GitHub.

Overview
Twister is a Twitter-like microblogging platform that utilizes the same blockchain technology as Bitcoin, and the file exchange method from BitTorrent, both based on P2P technologies.

The website seobloggingpro.com ranked Twister as the number 13 microblogging site, while seosandwitch.com ranked Twister as the number 4 microblogging site. (In the case of Twister, the ranking is not of the website itself, which exists primarily to facilitate downloads of the Twister platform.)

 Twister was experimental software in alpha phase, implemented as a distributed file sharing system. User registration and authentication is provided by a Bitcoin-like network, so it is completely distributed and does not depend on any central authority. Distribution of posts uses Kademlia distributed hash table (DHT) network and BitTorrent-like swarms, both provided by libtorrent.

Miguel Freitas, aiming to build a censor-resistant public posting platform, began development on Twister in July 2013 to address the concerns of free speech and privacy. Building on the work of Bitcoin and Bittorrent, he built the core structure in October 2013. Lucas Leal was hired to create HTML and CSS for the user interface, with Miguel writing required JavaScript code. 2,500 user accounts were registered in the first six days of operation.

As a completely decentralized network, Twister cannot be incapacitated since there is no unique point of attack to the system. Twister uses end-to-end encryption to protect communications. Twister is designed to prevent other users from knowing a user's GSM localization, IP address, and who the user is following. Users can publish public messages as with other microblogging platforms, but direct messages and private messages to other users are protected from unauthorised access.

History 

The Brazilian computer engineer and programmer Miguel Freitas started developing the new social network after learning about the massive spy programs of the USA's National Security Agency (NSA), as revealed by the NSA whistleblower Edward Snowden. He started to worry about the accessibility of that amount of information under the control of a single company under American jurisdiction.

According to Freitas, Twitter is the social network that has been most prominent in promoting democracy and organizing protests. Freitas built Twister using on privacy-preserving technology due to the risks involved in providing personal information on social networks in light of the mass surveillance conducted by the NSA. 

Freitas and his developer, Leal, built the alpha version of the application for Android, Linux and OS X. Versions for Windows and iPhone are not planned, but as it is open source anyone can create alternative operating system versions for the application.

While the project was in alpha phase Brian Armstrong, co-founder of Coinbase, believed that it was a great example of how the open protocol of Bitcoin can be used with diverse purposes.

Technology

Protocols 
Twister is a distributed system, it works as a peer-to-peer program. Unlike other decentralized networks (like pump.io/Identi.ca, StatusNet/GNU social or Diaspora), it does not require the user to use their own server and does not require a user to trust a third-party server in order to use it.

Bitcoin 
This is achieved through the Bitcoin protocol, though not through the network used by the cryptocurrency. The protocol handles the registration of users. In the same way miners verify transactions on the Bitcoin network to combat double spending, the Twister network verifies the users' names and that the message posted by a specific user is really from that user.

BitTorrent 
The messages are driven through the BitTorrent protocol. This allows for a distribution system of a great number of messages along the network in a fast and efficient way; and also, allows the users to receive notifications almost instantly about new messages and alerts – all without the need for a central server.

Since Twister uses end-to-end encryption, if intercepted, the private direct messages cannot be read by any other person apart from the addressee. The code used is the elliptic curve cryptography (different from the one used by the NSA) that is used in Bitcoin. It is thought to give a security level similar to a RSA code of 3072 bits. The data is not stored anywhere, so it cannot be used by any other cut. As a consequence, if a user loses their entry password, it is impossible for them to access their private messages.

Because it is a peer-to-peer system, there is not a central server from which the publications may be compiled (see PRISM). 

As Freitas explains, the system is designed in a way that the users cannot know if the other is online, their IP address, or what messages have been read. This information is not registered anywhere. Despite this, Freitas warns users that total anonymity may not be possible depending on the circumstances.

Platforms 
Twister was developed under the Linux environment, migrated successfully to Android and OS X.

One of the long-term objectives of the program is to move the whole cryptographic code of the implementation to the interface of the user of the browser. This way, users would be capable of accessing Twister through any client platform that they use, choosing any third-party server and still maintaining the security of their private passwords at all times.

Functionality 
The first Twister prototype is intended to reproduce the basic characteristics of any microblogging platform, including:
 Searching users and profiles of navigation
 Follow/unfollow
 Sending text messages limited to 140 characters
 Broadcasting and answering messages 
 Browsing through mailing routes, mentions, hashtags and direct messages (private)
Private messages require the addressee to following of the speaker, which is a common requisite in most of the existing platforms.

Some other characteristics can be difficult to implement in a completely decentralized system, requiring more effort. This includes the arbitrary register of the words in the posts and the recompilation of hashtags to find out the main tendencies.

Security 

Twister is a peer-to-peer microblogging platform without a central node mediating messages.

Twister uses 256-bit ECC encryption with the same  parameters as Bitcoin, providing similar security to a 3072-bit RSA key.

A significant bug bounty was offered, payable in bitcoin, for identified design flaws.

The direct message application is based on example code published by Ladar Levison of Lavabit.

Censorship 
People who run a node can delete a user's posts in the DHT, but not block the user's account.

Privacy 
Messages are sent encrypted directly between users.

Anonymity 
Peers' IP addresses are not recorded within the application, which avoids tracking of peers if the device is later compromised, but network interception can still identify data flows between devices.

In order to be 100% anonymous, the user would have to use a browser that masks the IP address, such as Tor or similar.

References

External links
 
 Community
 Building a Better Twitter: A Study of the Twitter Alternatives GNU Social, Quitter, rstat.us, and Twister

Distributed computing
Text messaging
Social networking services
Free software
Microblogging software
Android (operating system) software
Anonymity networks
Peer-to-peer computing
Brazilian inventions
Software using the BSD license
Software using the MIT license